Barnardetia is a genus of isopods belonging to the family Philosciidae.

Species:
 Barnardetia reducta (Barnard, 1958)

References

Isopoda
Crustacean genera